Matt Bartle (born February 20, 1965) is a Republican politician from Missouri. He was born in Columbia, Missouri.

He graduated from David H. Hickman High School, and went on to get a Bachelor of Arts degree in economics from the University of Missouri, and a J.D. degree from Northwestern University. While at Northwestern, he was the editor of law review. He is an attorney.

Bartle was first elected to the Missouri House of Representatives in 1998, and remained in that position through 2002. He was elected to the Missouri State Senate in 2002, and served as the chair of the Judiciary and Civil and Criminal Jurisprudence Committee, vice chair of the Aging, Families, Mental and Public Health Committee, and as a member of the Transportation Committee and the Commerce, Energy, and the Environment Committee. In January 2007, Sen. Bartle surprised many with a 17-hour filibuster against an appointee to the University of Missouri's Board of Curators. Bartle, a Christian conservative, was concerned about the appointee's views on stem-cell research.

Personal life
He is married, and has two children, Mack and Betsy, with his wife Annette. He is a member of the Phi Beta Kappa honorary, Beta Theta Pi fraternity, Mystical Seven, Abundant Life Baptist Church in Lee's Summit, Missouri, where he also teaches Sunday school, and the Blue Springs and Lee's Summit Chambers of Commerce.

References
 Official Manual, State of Missouri, 2005-2006. Jefferson City, MO:Secretary of State, 2005.
 Senator Matt Bartle's Official Website

1965 births
Living people
Republican Party members of the Missouri House of Representatives
Republican Party Missouri state senators
Northwestern University Pritzker School of Law alumni
Politicians from Columbia, Missouri
Hickman High School alumni
University of Missouri alumni